UFCU Disch–Falk Field is the baseball stadium of the University of Texas at Austin.  It has been home to Texas Longhorns baseball since it opened on February 17, 1975, replacing Clark Field as the home of the Longhorns.

The stadium is named for former Longhorns coaches Billy Disch and Bibb Falk. Beginning August 1, 2006, the name of the stadium was changed to UFCU Disch–Falk Field, following a sponsorship deal with a local credit union, University Federal Credit Union.

Stadium History

February 17, 1975 - The Longhorns swept a doubleheader from St. Mary’s, (Texas) 4-0 and 11-0, in their first games on the new field
April 19, 1975 - Stadium was dedicated as Disch-Falk Field prior to Texas’ doubleheader sweep of TCU (18-3 and 14-0)
Summer 1979 - New AstroTurf was installed on the infield
May 19, 1982 - The largest crowd ever to see a collegiate game at Disch-Falk Field – 8,000 fans – saw Texas defeat Oklahoma, 8-0, during the NCAA Central Regional
Summer 1985 - New AstroTurf was installed on the entire field
Summer 1989 - A new computerized scoreboard was installed in left field
Winter 1995 - New AstroTurf was installed on the infield.
Winter 1996 - The computerized scoreboard was upgraded
Winter 1999 - New AstroTurf was installed on the entire field, the outfield fence was constructed and padded and the clubhouse and team areas were renovated
Spring 2005 - New scoreboard with Jumbotron is installed in left field
August 1, 2006 - Stadium renamed UFCU Dicsh-Falk Field  
Spring 2008 - Work completed on $25.8 million renovation of UFCU Disch–Falk Field
Fall 2009 - FieldTurf playing surface was installed
Spring 2012 - New videoboard installed in right field
Winter 2016 - New FieldTurf playing surface was installed and the fences in the gaps were moved closer
Winter 2019 - Replaced left field scoreboard with a new videoboard
Fall 2019 - Opened the 21,500-square-foot J. Dan Brown Family Player Development Center

Note: The entire playing surface, excluding the pitcher's mound, is FieldTurf.

Attendance
In 2013, the Longhorns ranked 6th among Division I baseball programs in attendance, averaging 5,793 per home game.

In 2012, college baseball writer Eric Sorenson ranked the stadium as the fifth best big game atmosphere in Division I baseball.

Changes to Disch-Falk

2006-2008 Renovation

In July 2005, the University announced an $18 million renovation project for Disch-Falk Field.  Construction began in late 2006.  The Longhorns played their 2007 season at the stadium during the renovation, although a few early season games and the NCAA Regional Tournament were moved to the nearby Dell Diamond. Completed for the 2008 season, the renovated Disch-Falk field was designed by architectural firm DLR Group.  The renovations included:

 107 premium seats added increasing capacity to 6,756
 17 new suites
 lowering of the seating bowl six feet to field level
 complete replacement of the seating bowl
 expanded concourse
 new team merchandise store
 new full-service ticket office
 expanded concessions and restrooms
 enhanced media services spaces
 new lighting and sound systems
 new metal wall cladding and TPO roof 
 dugouts moved closer to the field
 new bullpens
 new weight training facility
 new team training areas
 new team meeting room
 new coaches offices
 replacement of AstroTurf surface with FieldTurf.

Scoreboard
Before the 2019 season the left field videoboard was completely replaced. The right field scoreboard was installed before the 2012 season.

Naming
October 12, 2005, the University announced a $13.1 million gift from University Federal Credit Union as the major gift in the campaign to finance the renovation of the ballpark.  In connection with this gift, the name of the stadium changed to UFCU Disch–Falk Field on August 1, 2006.

Attendance records
Through June 3, 2022

Gallery

See also

 List of NCAA Division I baseball venues

References

External links
UFCU Disch-Falk Field information at TexasSports.com
Texas Step Up to the Plate Renovation Donation Campaign
Disch-Falk renovation and renaming announcement at TexasSports.com
DLR Group awarded expansion contract
DLR Group website

College baseball venues in the United States
Baseball venues in Austin, Texas
Texas Longhorns baseball venues
University of Texas at Austin campus
Southwest Conference Baseball Tournament venues